Trent Dalton is an Australian journalist and literary fiction author.

Early life
Trent Dalton grew up in a Housing Commission house in Bracken Ridge, a suburb on the northern outskirts of Brisbane.

Journalism
Dalton worked as a journalist for The Courier-Mail.  he works as a staff writer for The Weekend Australian Magazine.

Works

Boy Swallows Universe
In 2018 he published the semi-autobiographical novel Boy Swallows Universe (novel) through 4th Estate, which was longlisted for the 2019 Miles Franklin Award.

In May 2019 the film adaptation rights for Boy Swallows Universe were won by Anonymous Content, Chapter One and Hopscotch Features, to be directed by Australian actor and director Joel Edgerton.

Queensland Theatre Company developed a play from the book, its performance delayed by the COVID-19 pandemic in Australia in 2020, but later scheduled to premiere in September at the 2021 Brisbane Festival.

In March 2022, Netflix announced to develop a limited series adaptation.

All Our Shimmering Skies
All Our Shimmering Skies  was published by HarperCollins in September 2020.

Love Stories
Love Stories  was published by HarperCollins in October 2021.

Non-fiction
By Sea & Stars: The Story of the First Fleet, 4th Estate (2018)

Awards

Journalism awards

Walkley Awards
2011: Winner: Social Equity Journalism for "Home is where the hurt is"
2015: Winner: Feature Writing Short (under 4000 words) for "The Ghosts of Murray Street"
2020: Shortlisted: Feature Writing Long (over 4000 words) for "Back From The Black"

Literary prizes
Australian Book Industry Awards
2019: Winner: ABIA Book of the Year Boy Swallows Universe
2019: Winner: Literary Fiction Book of the Year Boy Swallows Universe
2019: Winner: The Matt Richell Award for New Writer of the Year Boy Swallows Universe
2019: Winner: Audio Book of the Year Boy Swallows Universe (Narr. Stig Wemyss)
2021: Shortlisted: Literary Fiction Book of the Year All Our Shimmering Skies
Indie Book Awards
2019: Winner: Debut fiction Boy Swallows Universe
2021: Shortlisted: Fiction All Our Shimmering Skies
2022: Shortlisted: Nonfiction Love Stories
International Dublin Literary Award
 2020: Longlisted: Boy Swallows Universe
MUD Literary Prize
2019: Winner, for Boy Swallows Universe, his first literary prize
New South Wales Premier's Literary Awards
 2019: Shortlisted: Christina Stead Prize for Fiction, for Boy Swallows Universe
 2019: Winner: UTS Glenda Adams Award for New Writing, for Boy Swallows Universe
Queensland Literary Awards
 2019: Shortlisted: Queensland Premier's Literary Award for a work of State Significance, for Boy Swallows Universe
 2019: Shortlisted: The Courier-Mail People's Choice Queensland Book of the Year Award, for Boy Swallows Universe
Voss Literary Prize
 2019: Shortlisted, Boy Swallows Universe

References

Further reading

External links

Place of birth missing (living people)
Living people
21st-century Australian novelists
The Australian journalists
Walkley Award winners
Writers from Brisbane
1979 births